Karleen is a feminine given name. Notable people referred to by this name include the following:

Given name
Karleen Bradford (born 1936), Canadian author
Karleen Koen, American novelist
Karleen Pendleton Jiménez (born 1971), American writer
Karleen Thompson (born 1969), American basketball coach

See also

Carleen (given name)
Karlee
Karlene